"You've Never Seen" (originally titled as Like You've Never Seen) is a 2012 song by electronic duo EC Twins featuring singer CeCe Peniston, released as a digital single on Smash the House Records on August 6, 2012.

Credits and personnel
 Allister Blackham  - performer, writer
 Marc Sean Blackham  - performer, writer
 Cecilia Peniston - lead vocals, writer
 Dmitry Korchmaryov  - producer, remix
 Kevin D. Lewis - writer
 Nick Terranova - writer
 Timothy Bullock - writer

Track listing and format
 MD, EU, #STH016
 "You've Never Seen"  (Original Mix)" - 5:48

References

General

 Specific

External links 
 

2012 singles
CeCe Peniston songs
2012 songs
Songs written by CeCe Peniston